Edward Barton may refer to:

 Edward Barton (diplomat) (1562–1598), English ambassador to the Ottoman Empire
 Edward Gustavus Campbell Barton (1857–1942), electrical engineer, early wireless experimenter and Queensland politician
 Edward Barton (musician), English poet, artist and musician
 Edward Barton (priest) (1768–1848), Irish Anglican priest
 Eddie Barton, New Zealand football (soccer) player

See also
 Edward William Barton-Wright (1860–1951), British entrepreneur
 Edmund Barton (1849–1920), Australian politician and first Australian Prime Minister